Halloween 3 or variation may refer to:

Film
 Halloween III: Season of the Witch (1982 film), the third film in the Halloween film franchise, unrelated to the original first two films

Television
 Halloween 3: AwesomeLand (2014 TV episode), episode 6 of season 6 (126th episode) of Modern Family
 Halloween III (1995 TV episode) Halloween special for Dr. Quinn, Medicine Woman, see List of Halloween television specials
 Halloween III: The Driving (2012 TV episode) season 4 episode 6, Halloween special, for The Middle, see List of Halloween television specials
 Halloween III (2015 TV episode) Halloween special for Brooklyn Nine-Nine, see List of Halloween television specials

See also
 Halloween (franchise)
 Halloween (disambiguation)